Nationality words link to articles with information on the nation's poetry or literature (for instance, Irish or France).

Events

Works published

Colonial America
 James Bowdoin, four poems in the anthology Harvard Verses presented to George III in an attempt to gain royal support for Harvard College
 Thomas Godfrey, "The Court of Fancy: A Poem", English, Colonial America
 Francis Hopkinson:
 "An Exercise"
 "Science: A Poem"
 A Collection of Psalm Tunes

United Kingdom
 James Boswell, The Cub at Newmarket, published by James Dodsley
 Elizabeth Carter, Poems on Several Occasions
 Charles Churchill, The Ghost, Books I-III (followed by Book IV in 1763)
 Mary Collier, Poems, on Several Occasions
 John Cunningham, The Contemplatist
 Thomas Denton, The House of Superstition, prefixed to William Gilpin's Lives of the Reformers, written in imitation of Edmund Spenser
 William Falconer, The Shipwreck (revised in 1764 and 1769)
 Edward Jerningham, The Nunnery: An elegy in imitation of the Elegy in a Churchyard, an imitation of Thomas Gray
 James Macpherson, Fingal, an Ancient Epic Poem [...] Together with several other poems translated from the Galic language (see also Fragment of Ancient Poetry 1760, and Temora 1763)
 John Ogilvie, Poems on Various Subjects
 William Whitehead, A Charge to the Poets
 Edward Young, Resignation, published anonymously; first privately printed 1761

Other
 Tomás António Gonzaga, Marília de Dirceu, Portuguese
 Giulio Variboba, Ghiella e Shën Mëriis Virghiër, Arbëresh

Births
Death years link to the corresponding "[year] in poetry" article:
 February 25 (bapt.) – Susanna Rowson (died 1824), English-American novelist, playwright, poet, lyricist, religious writer, stage actress and educator
 c. March or October – Thomas Russell (died 1788), English poet
 September 11 – Joanna Baillie (died 1851), Scottish poet and dramatist
 September 24 – William Lisle Bowles (died 1850), English poet and critic
 October 21 – George Colman the Younger (died 1837), English dramatist and miscellaneous writer
 October 30 – André Chénier (guillotined 1794), French poet
 November 30 – Samuel Egerton Brydges (died 1837), English bibliographer, writer, poet, genealogist and politician
 Approximate date – James Bisset (died 1832), Scottish-born artist, manufacturer, writer, collector, art dealer and poet

Deaths
Birth years link to the corresponding "[year] in poetry" article:
 June 26 – Luise Gottsched (born 1713), German poet
 August 21 – Lady Mary Wortley Montagu (born 1689), English aristocrat and writer
 October 20 (bur.) – Mary Collier (born 1688), English poet and washerwoman

See also

Poetry
List of years in poetry

Notes

18th-century poetry
Poetry